MTV Unplugged (Live at Hull City Hall) is a live album by English singer and songwriter Liam Gallagher. It was released on 12 June 2020 by Warner Records. It was originally set for release on 24 April 2020 but was delayed until June due to the COVID-19 pandemic. The album was recorded at Hull City Hall on 3 August 2019, consisting of 10 live acoustic performances of solo material by Gallagher and Oasis that were culled from the 15 songs which were performed on the night, including a cover of "Natural Mystic" by Bob Marley and the Wailers that was ultimately not included on the album.

MTV Unplugged (Live at Hull City Hall) is the first live release to top the UK Albums Chart since George Michael's Symphonica in 2014, and is the biggest selling vinyl release of 2020.

Critical reception

MTV Unplugged (Live at Hull City Hall) received generally favourable reviews from music critics. At Metacritic, which assigns a weighted average rating out of 100 to reviews from mainstream publications, the album has an average score of 73, based on 10 reviews, indicating "generally favourable".

Chart performance
MTV Unplugged debuted at number 50 in Australia, number 19 in Austria, number 26 in Belgian Flanders Ultratop, number 13 in Belgian Wallonia Ultratop, number 34 in Netherlands, number 45 in France, number 8 in Germany, number 11 in Italy, number 15 in Switzerland. On 25 June 2020, the album also ranked at number 1 in Ireland, Scotland and in the UK.

Track listing

Personnel
Credits adapted from Tidal.

Musicians
 Liam Gallagher – lead vocals 
 Drew McConnell – bass , backing vocals , guitar 
 Andy Marshall – double bass 
 Andy Waterworth – double bass 
 Dan McDougall – drums , backing vocals , percussion 
 Jay Mehler – guitar 
 Mike Moore – guitar 
 Paul Arthurs – guitar 
 Christian Madden – keyboard 
 Klara Schuman – cello 
 Llinos Richards – cello 
 Maia Colette – cello 
 Neil Broadbent – cello 
 Helen Sanders-Hewwt – viola 
 Helenah Logah – viola 
 Rhiannon James – viola 
 Vince Green – viola 
 Alex Afia – violin 
 Eugene Feygelson – violin 
 Gareth Griffths – violin 
 Hazel Ross – violin 
 Jonathan Hill – violin 
 Lizzie Ball – violin 
 Frida Touray – backing vocals 
 Holly Quin-Ankrah – backing vocals 
 Rhianna Kelly – backing vocals 

Production
 Eduardo Puhl – engineer 
 Adam Noble – mixing 
 Chris Elliot – arranged strings 
 Stephen Hussey – arranged strings 
 Robin Schmidt – mastering 

James Russell - Multi Camera Director for MTV
Jeremy Davies - Executive Producer for MTV

Charts

References

External links
 

2020 live albums
Liam Gallagher albums
MTV Unplugged albums
Warner Records live albums